Para powerlifting at the 2021 Asian Youth Para Games was held in Bahrain 5 December 2021.

Medal table 
The number of medals won by some countries has been announced more than the number, but due to the application of the law minus one and also the lack of quorum of participants in some events and disciplines, a number of medals obtained from the final figure and announced by the organizing committee has been reduced.

Medalists 
Schedule:</ref></ref>

This is only day one results:

Boy
Youth

Junior

Girl
Youth

Junior

References

External links 
 Full Results

Sports competitions in Bahrain
2021
2021 in Asian sport
2021 in Bahraini sport
Asian Youth Para Games
Asian Youth Para Games
Asian Youth Para Games
2021 Asian Youth Para Games